This is a listing of the horses that finished in either first, second, or third place and the number of starters in the Jim McKay Turf Sprint, an American stakes race for three-year-olds and older at 5 furlongs on the  turf held at Pimlico Race Course in Baltimore, Maryland.

See also 

 Jim McKay Turf Sprint
 Pimlico Race Course
 List of graded stakes at Pimlico Race Course

References

Pimlico Race Course
Lists of horse racing results